Gyraulus cockburni is a species of small, mostly air-breathing, freshwater snail, aquatic pulmonate gastropod mollusk in the family Planorbidae, the ram's horn snails.

This species is endemic to Socotra, Yemen.

References

cockburni
Gastropods of Asia
Endemic fauna of Socotra
Taxonomy articles created by Polbot